Brzostowa Góra  is a village in the administrative district of Gmina Majdan Królewski, within Kolbuszowa County, Subcarpathian Voivodeship, in south-eastern Poland.

References

Villages in Kolbuszowa County